Crisilla quisquiliarum is a species of minute sea snail, a marine gastropod mollusk or micromollusk in the family Rissoidae.

Description

Distribution

References

 Gofas, S.; Le Renard, J.; Bouchet, P. (2001). Mollusca. in: Costello, M.J. et al. (Ed.) (2001). European register of marine species: a check-list of the marine species in Europe and a bibliography of guides to their identification. Collection Patrimoines Naturels. 50: pp. 180–213
 Oliver, J. D.; Rolán, E.; Templado, J. (2019). The littoral species of the genus Crisilla Monterosato, 1917 (Caenogastropoda, Rissoidae) in Azores, Madeira, Selvagens and Canary Islands with notes on West African taxa and the description of four new species. Iberus. 37(1): 23-80.

External links
 Watson, R. B. (1886). Report on the Scaphopoda and Gasteropoda collected by H.M.S. Challenger during the years 1873-76. Report on the Scientific Results of the Voyage of H.M.S. Challenger during the years 1873–76. Zoology 15 (part 42): 1-756, pls 1-50

Rissoidae
Gastropods described in 1886